Lalinac (Svrljig)   is a village in the municipality of Svrljig, Serbia. According to the 2002 census, the village has a population of 445 people.

Lalinac, in Serb Cyrillics , is a village in Serbia located in the municipality of Svrljig, and the district of Nišava. In 2002, it had 445 inhabitants, all Serbs.

See also 

 List of cities, towns and villages in Serbia (A-M)
 List of cities in Serbia

References

External links
 Satellite view of Lalinac
 Lalinac

Populated places in Nišava District